Antonina De Angelis (possibly Antonina de Angelis, 24 October 1880 – 25 February 1962) was an Italian Roman Catholic who was a professed sister of the Daughters of Our Lady of Mercy, established by Maria Giuseppa Rossello. Upon admittance into the order, she assumed the name of "Maria Ludovica". She initially served in Italy, but moved to Argentina where she devoted her time to children and the children's hospital in La Plata. She died there in 1962. Pope John Paul II beatified her in 2004.

Life
Antonina De Angelis was born in San Gregorio, Italy on 24 October 1880 as the first of eight children and was baptized on the date of her birth. As a child, De Angelis enjoyed nature and she worked daily in the fields near her home. Somewhat reserved, she decided to pursue a religious vocation. She entered the congregation of the Daughters of Our Lady of Mercy on 17 November 1904 and was granted the name of "Maria Ludovica". On 14 November 1907, she left Italy for Buenos Aires, Argentina, traveling by boat and arriving on 4 December.

She was assigned in 1908 to work as the manager of the kitchen, linens and pantry for the Children's Hospital of La Plata (now known as Sor María Ludovica Hospital de Niños), When she arrived at the hospital, it had only 60 beds and two wooden chambers. Sister Maria Ludovica was later made the supervisor and head administrator of the children's hospital. She focused on expanding services for the children, securing funds to build additional patient and operating rooms, acquire medical equipment, and construct a convalescent center. She also was instrumental in the building of a chapel and creation of a farm to provide fresh produce for the children of the hospital. She was also instrumental in securing a grant from the Municipality of La Plata to maintain the hospital, which guaranteed its longevity. After her death, the city took over the administration of the facility.

De Angelis died in 1962 in La Plata.

Beatification
Her beatification began when the current Superior of the children's hospital, Sister Emilia Paternosto, was told of "divine favor" some had received when praying to Sister Maria Ludovica. Paternosto initiated the process of canonization in 1985 and the following year Antonio Quarracino, Archbishop of La Plata, elevated the case to the diocesan level. After investigations were completed, the title of Servant of God was conferred upon her in 1990. In 1992, after claims by a mother that her daughter with spina bifida was able to walk after intercession from Sister Maria Ludovica, a team of doctors examined the evidence and the Vatican concluded the healing was  "scientifically inexplicable". In 2001, she was declared to have lived a life of heroic virtue and was granted the title of Venerable by Pope John Paul II. On November 18, 2003, the Congregation for the Causes of Saints signed the authenticity of a miracle and John Paul II approved the findings the following month. He beatified her on 3 October 2004.

Claims of a second miraculous healing and investigation of the claim began in 2007 and investigation was still on-going in 2010.

References

External links
Hagiography Circle

1880 births
1962 deaths
Argentine beatified people
Italian beatified people
Beatifications by Pope John Paul II
19th-century venerated Christians
20th-century venerated Christians
Venerated Catholics by Pope John Paul II